Air Deccan is an Indian regional airline currently operating from Ahmedabad, Gujarat. It flies to a total of four destinations using Beech 1900D aircraft, as of November 2019. As of October 2021, the airline had temporarily suspended operations as a result of the COVID-19 pandemic

Destinations
Air Deccan focuses on flying to cities with little to no air service where there is minimal competition with major airlines. The airline flies to the following destinations in India:

Fleet
The airline utilises two Beech 1900D aircraft as of December 2017, each of which is equipped with 18 seats.

References

External links
 

2017 establishments in Gujarat
Airlines of India
Indian brands
Airlines established in 2017
